Francisco Gómez Kodela (born July 7, 1984) is an Argentine rugby union player. He currently plays for the Bordeaux Bègles club in the French league Top 14. He also plays for the Argentina national team, Los Pumas. His usual position is prop.

Gómez Kodela was a starter for the  national team on 14 November 2020 in their first ever win against the All Blacks.

References

External links 
Player statistics on L'Equipe

1985 births
Argentine rugby union players
Biarritz Olympique players
Living people
Rugby union players from Buenos Aires
Rugby union props
Expatriate rugby union players in France
Argentina international rugby union players
Argentine expatriate sportspeople in France
Argentine expatriate rugby union players
Union Bordeaux Bègles players
Lyon OU players